Sir Jan Alfred Lewando   (31 May 1909 – 2 July 2004) was a British businessman who was chairman of Carrington Viyella, and a former director of M&S.

Lewando was born into the Polish Ashkenazi community in Manchester, which included Marks and Spencer's founding families. His father who was a gifted tenor had left Poland for Ireland during the pogroms.

Lewando was knighted In the 1974 New Year Honours.

Personal life
In 1948, he married Nora Slavouski and they had three daughters.

He died on 2 July 2004, aged 95.

References

1909 births
2004 deaths
Knights Bachelor
Businesspeople awarded knighthoods
English Jews
British people of Polish-Jewish descent
20th-century English businesspeople